East County, San Diego is a region in San Diego County, California.

East County may also refer to:

 Łódź East County, a county in Poland
 East County Fire & Rescue, an emergency services provider in Clark County, Washington